Liverpool Central School District is a public school district in a suburban community near Syracuse, New York in Onondaga County. It has eight elementary schools, four middle schools and Liverpool High School with a district enrollment of about 7,033 students. Liverpool Central School District serves the entire Village of Liverpool and portions of the towns of Clay and Salina. Daniel G. Henner is the Superintendent of Schools.

History

Board of Education

The Liverpool Central School district's Board of Education consists of nine community-elected volunteers who meet twice a month to determine the running of the district. They are the major policymakers and must approve a majority of district issues before they can be handled or instituted. As per the Open Meetings Act, all BOE meetings are open to the public and meeting minutes are posted online.

Current Board Members

The Board's current members are:
 Craig Dailey, President
 Richard Pento,Vice President
 Stacey Balduf
 Nicholas Blaney
 Hayley Downs
 Kimberly Martin
 Joseph Morawski
 Katherine Roberts
 James M. Root

Student Liaisons

Liverpool High School students serve as liaisons to the Board of Education for a two-year term. The students have no voting power but give insight to student affairs. The current student liaisons are: Nneamaka Nwaezeapu and Aidan Lloyd.

District Administrators
The district is run by a series of administrators, all of whom are responsible for providing pertinent information related to their subject field at board meetings. They work under the superintendent.

Assistant Superintendents
 Douglas Lawrence, Deputy Superintendent
 Timothy Manning, Assistant Superintendent for Human Resources

Executive Directors and Directors of Programs
 Amy DiVita,  Executive Director of Special Education
 Richard Chapman, Executive Director for Elementary Education
 Michael Baroody, Executive Director of Secondary Education
 Dana Ziegler, Executive Director for Humanities and Middle Level Education
 Brett Woodcock, Executive Principal (High School)
 Kasey Dolson, Executive Director for Math, Science and Technology
 Jennifer Woody, Director of School Business Administration
 Jennifer DiBianco, Director of Student Services
 Harmony Booker-Balintfy, Director of Staff Services
 Teresa Bowers, Director of Special Education (Elementary)
 Jennifer Fragola, Directory of Special Education (Secondary)
 Daniel Farsaci, Director of Technology
 Adan Shatraw, Director of Fine Arts
 Ari Liberman, Director of Health, Physical Education and Athletics
 Annette Marchbanks, Director of Food Service
 Sean Brown, Director of Transportation
 Darrell Clisson, Director of Facilities
 Michael McCarthy, Director of Security

Schools

Elementary schools
Chestnut Hill Elementary (3-5, South Quadrant)
Donlin Drive Elementary (K-2, South Quadrant)
Elmcrest Elementary (K-2, Central Quadrant)
Liverpool Elementary (3-5, Liverpool Quadrant)
Long Branch Elementary (K-2, Liverpool Quadrant)
Morgan Road Elementary (3-5, Central Quadrant)
Soule Road Elementary (3-5, North Quadrant)
Willow Field Elementary (K-2, North Quadrant)

Middle schools
Chestnut Hill Middle School (6-8, South Quadrant)
Liverpool Middle School (6-8, Liverpool Quadrant)
Morgan Road Middle School (6-8, Central Quadrant)
Soule Road Middle School (6-8, Central Quadrant)

High school
Liverpool High School (9-12) (article)

Former Schools
Craven Crawford Elementary - Closed as a school; became the District Office
A.V. Zogg Middle School - Closed after 1980-1981 school year to be used as district offices.  It has since been bought and sold several times, including by the Liverpool Community Church. It is currently owned by Syracuse Studios, a film production services company, and film production company American High has produced four feature films in the building.
Mark Loveless Elementary - now the Town of Salina offices.
Wetzel Road Elementary - closed due to budget cuts at the end of the 2009-2010 school year. It has since been used as additional classroom space as renovations occur at Liverpool High School, being used for fine arts courses and physical education purposes.
Liverpool High School Annex (9th grade building, referred to as LHX) - closed at the end of the 2020-2021 school year and is now Morgan Road Middle School.
Nate Perry Elementary - closed at the end of the 2021-2022 school year.

References 

School districts in New York (state)
Education in Onondaga County, New York
District boards of education in the United States